Ronald Gamble (born January 2, 1933) is a former Democratic member of the Pennsylvania House of Representatives.

References

1933 births
Living people
People from Oakdale, Pennsylvania
Democratic Party members of the Pennsylvania House of Representatives